FX is a Canadian English-language discretionary service channel owned as a partnership between Rogers Sports & Media, a division of Rogers Communications (which owns a controlling 66.64% interest and serves as managing partner), and the FX Networks subsidiary of Walt Disney Television (which owns the remaining 33.36%). Based on the U.S. cable network of the same name, FX is devoted primarily to scripted dramas and comedies.

History
In February 2011, Rogers Media was granted approval by the Canadian Radio-television and Telecommunications Commission (CRTC) to launch a television channel called Highwire, described as "a national, English-language Category 2 specialty programming service devoted to the entire genre of action and adventure, including selections from crime fiction, epic and heroic drama."

The channel was launched on October 31, 2011, as FX Canada in standard and high definition. The channel was wholly owned by Rogers Media at its launch. However, on December 16, 2011, the CRTC approved an application for FX Networks to purchase a 20% interest in the channel's direct parent company, and a 16.7% interest in the holding company owning the other 80%, for an overall ownership interest of 33.6% (with Rogers retaining the remainder). Shaw Direct added the channel on November 22, 2012.

On April 15, 2013, it was announced that FX Canada had acquired the exclusive domestic broadcast rights to air future episodes of soap operas All My Children and One Life to Live, which were rebooted through Hulu and iTunes in the United States. However, on May 17, 2013, almost three weeks since the premieres, and a day after Prospect Park announced a schedule change for both series that reduced each week's broadcasts to two episodes (from four), All My Children and One Life to Live were abruptly pulled from FX Canada's schedule. They were replaced by reruns of 30 Rock.

Rogers had tentatively planned to launch a Canadian version of FXX, the U.S. spinoff channel launched in September 2013 to which several FX comedy series moved. In the meantime, series that have moved to FXX continued to air on FX Canada. Originally planned for January 2014, the Canadian version of FXX eventually launched on April 1, 2014.

In October 2014, nearly three years after its launch, Bell Satellite TV reached a deal to carry FX Canada and FXX; they were added to its satellite and Fibe TV lineups on October 10, 2014. Bell was one of the most prominent television providers not to carry FX Canada - a fact regularly noted in promotions for the channel on its sibling networks. It was reported that the channel's incorporation into the revamped Hockey Night in Canada was an impetus for the deal.

In January 2015, the channel began referring to itself as FX, in addition to adopting the current logo used worldwide.

In December 2021, Disney announced that it would discontinue the "FX on Hulu" brand.

Programming

As part of the agreement between Rogers Media and FX Networks, any new original series produced for the flagship FX channel in the United States by its co-owned studios, FXP and 20th Television, will air on FX Canada. This also included series commissioned for the FX on Hulu hub launched in 2020, such as Devs and Mrs. America, as the Hulu streaming service is not available in Canada. Since February 23, 2021 with the launch of the Star hub on Disney+, all FX on Hulu original series not previously announced as airing on FX Canada, starting with American Horror Stories and Reservation Dogs, will instead air on Disney+ via Star.

This means that while the channel airs most programming from FX, it does not carry all original series that premiered prior to 2011. For example, It's Always Sunny in Philadelphia didn't air on the channel until mid-2013, and FX Canada only had second window rights to Sons of Anarchy, as premiere rights to each season had been previously sold to Super Channel. It also did not carry certain series produced by other studios, such as Anger Management (produced by Lionsgate) or Justified (primarily produced by Sony Pictures Television). In most of these cases, broadcast rights were purchased by other Canadian broadcasters. As of 2021, the two in-production FX or FXX original series not airing on the Canadian equivalents of those channels are animated series Archer, which was acquired by Corus Entertainment (for broadcast on its Teletoon at Night block and, later, Adult Swim), and The New York Times Presents, which is distributed separately by Red Arrow Studios and eventually became available in Canada on Crave. Cake has not aired on the FXX Canada linear channel, but past seasons have since become available on demand on FXNow Canada, as well as on Disney+ in Canada.

In addition to FX programming, the channel airs off-network repeats of various sitcoms, as well as repeats of Citytv and CBC original programs to fulfill Canadian content requirements.

Additionally, FX Canada serves as an overflow channel for Sportsnet; its license dictates that it can air up to 10% sports programming. During the 2013 Major League Baseball season, FX Canada aired six pre-season Toronto Blue Jays games. The channel was made available as a free preview to providers during this period as well. During the 2014–15 season, FX Canada occasionally aired NHL games on Saturday nights as part of Rogers' Hockey Night in Canada. They primarily simulcasted all-U.S. matchups from American regional sports networks.

Since December 2021, past seasons of all FX, FXX, and FX on Hulu original programming, such as American Horror Story, Mayans M.C., among others became available on Disney+ in Canada.

See also
 FX (UK)
 FX Australia
 FX (Greece)
 FX (Asia)
 FX (Latin America)

References

External links
 

Rogers Communications
Canada
Digital cable television networks in Canada
Television channels and stations established in 2011
English-language television stations in Canada
2011 establishments in Canada